Stones of the Selt is a 1981 role-playing game adventure published by Dragon Tree Press.

Contents
Stones of the Selt is the first of a planned series of five modules, each describing the islands located in the Epxae Islands campaign.

Reception
Lewis Pulsipher reviewed Stones of the Selt in The Space Gamer No. 45. Pulsipher commented that "All in all, I can't recommend it, but if you see it in a shop you might take a look."

References

Fantasy role-playing game adventures
Role-playing game supplements introduced in 1981